L'uomo dagli occhi di ghiaccio (internationally released as The Man with Icy Eyes) is a 1971 Italian giallo film directed by Alberto De Martino.  It starred Barbara Bouchet, Antonio Sabato, Keenan Wynn, Faith Domergue and Victor Buono. It was shot in Albuquerque, New Mexico. The film was referred to as "an unusual mixture of action-thriller and giallo in Argento's style".

Plot 
A state senator is murdered outside his home, and the police arrest a strange man with "icy eyes" as the killer. An Italian reporter finds a stripper who claims that she actually witnessed the man commit the crime. But the reporter later finds holes in her story, and eventually comes to believe that the police have the wrong man.

Cast 
 Antonio Sabàto: Eddie Mills 
 Barbara Bouchet: Anne Saxe 
 Faith Domergue: Mrs. Valdes 
 Victor Buono: John Hammond 
 Keenan Wynn: Harry Davis 
 Corrado Gaipa: Isaac Thetman 
 Nello Pazzafini: Man in Elevator

References

External links

1971 films
Giallo films
Films directed by Alberto De Martino
1970s action thriller films
1970s crime thriller films
Films set in the United States
English-language Italian films
1970s Italian-language films
1970s Italian films